Knyaz Rostislavich (Ростиславич) or Knyaz Rostislavovich (Ростиславович) (literally: son of Rostislav) may refer to one of the following persons.

Yaropolk III Rostislavich (11XX - 1182?), a Russian Veliky Knyaz (Grand Prince) between 1174 and 1175, knayz of Suzdal. He was nephew of Andrei I Bogolyubsky
Mstislav Rostislavich Eyless (Мстислав Ростиславич Безокий) (?-1178), knyaz of Novgorod, son of Suzdal knyaz Rostislav Yuryevich (Ростислав Юрьевич)
Gleb Rostislavich (Глеб Ростиславич) - (?-1177), kniaz of Ryazan, son of Rostislav Yaroslavich
Mstislav Rostislavich the Brave (Мстислав Ростиславич Храбрый) - (1180), knyaz of Novgorod and Smolensk, son of Rostislav Mstislavich (Ростислав Мстиславич) of Smolensk
David Rostislavich (Давид Ростиславич) (1140–1197) - Smolensk kniaz, son of Rostislav Mstislavich (Ростислав Мстиславич) of Smolensk
 Konstantin Rostislavich (Константин Ростиславович) (12??-12??)- Smolensk kniaz, son of Rostislav Mstislavich (Ростислав Мстиславич) of Smolensk
Theodor Rostislavich Black (Феодор Ростиславич Черный) (?-1298)- saint, kniaz of Smolensk and Yaroslavl, son of Rostislav Mstislavich (Ростислав Мстиславич) of Smolensk
Rurik Rostislavich (Vassily Rostislavich) (Рюрик-Василий Ростиславич) (?-1215), Veliky Kniaz of Kiev, son of Veliky Kniaz of Kiev Rostislav Mikhailovich (Ростислав Михайлович), grandson of Vladimir Monomakh
Svyatoslav Rostislavich (Святослав Ростиславич) (?-1170) - Novgorod knyaz, son of Veliky Kniaz Rostislav Mikhailovich of Kiev
 Volodar Vladimir Rostislavich (Володарь-Владимир Ростиславич) (?-1124)-  knyaz of Peremyshl, son of Tmutarakan kniaz Rostislav Vladimirovich (Ростислав Владимирович)
Vasilko Rostislavich (Василько Ростиславович) (10??-11??), knyaz of Terebovl (Теребовль, Требовль), son of Tmutarakan kniaz Rostislav Vladimirovich
 Prince Rostislav Rostislavich

Surnames of Russian origin